Samita Bangargi is an Indian actress who is most known for her roles in Ramji Londonwaley (2005), Shaadi Ka Laddoo (2004) and Yeh Kya Ho Raha Hai? (2002).

Personal life 
Samita Bangargi married Ashish Chaudhary on 27 January 2006. The couple has 3 children, a son born in 2008 and twin daughters in 2014. 
Ashish lost his sister and brother in law in the 26 November attacks in 2008, since then Ashish's nephew and niece also live with them.

Filmography

References

External links 
 

Indian film actresses
Living people
Year of birth missing (living people)
Female models from Assam
Actresses from Guwahati
Actresses in Hindi cinema
21st-century Indian actresses